American singer-songwriter Madonna has been regarded as a sexual icon and defined by an author, as the leading sex symbol of the postmodern era. Many have considered Madonna's sexuality as one of the focal points of her career. The Oxford Dictionary of English (2010) credited her image as a sex symbol as a source of her international stardom. Her sexual displays have drawn numerous analysis by scholars, sexologists, feminists, and other authors. Due to her constant usage of explicit sexual content, Madonna faced censorship by MTV for her videos, as well as by other entities for her stage performances, and other projects. 

Aware of other female performers that paved the way, Madonna's path is notably recognized by a number of authors and scholars in opened up a variety of things, as depends on point of views, for both positive or negative. Historian Lilly J. Goren commented that Madonna perpetuated the public perception of women performers as feminine and sexual objects, but also found that industry exploited Madonna's concepts of using sexuality to gain power and sell more records, an approach normalized since then and with Madonna having a catalyst role. Feminist scholars Cheris Kramarae and Dale Spender described her inescapable influence saying "she created an illusion of sexual availability that many female pop artists felt compelled to emulate".

The criticism of Madonna's overt sexuality would become a constant through her career. Madonna herself decries a double-standard in various opportunities, for which various agents such as Goren, Alina Simone and David Gauntlett have supported some of her statements. As her career continued, she polarized some views about sexuality in an aged woman. In her career, Madonna has also promoted safe sex and advocated for women's sexuality and individuality; she actively supported other groups and charities during the AIDS pandemic of the 1980s and 1990s, and continued her advocacy in the next decades, including throughout her charity Raising Malawi founded in 2006.

Madonna's sexuality influence on others was also much quoted. Earliest reviewers noted it on her young audience, also called the Madonna wannabes and over the years, on her fandom, including those from the LGBT community, as well on other artists. As her sexual-brand became very visible and mainstream, she was called variously. Named by an author in the mid-1990s as the "most arcane and sexually perverse female of the twentieth century", commentators like Steve Allen describes it of a "professional prostitute". She was also praised or criticized by some of her industry colleagues. Both her impact and sex appeal were recognized in listicles, topping the list of Toronto Suns 50 Greatest Sex Symbols in history (2006) and VH1's 100 Sexiest Artists (2002).

Critical scope 

Madonna has been referred to as a sexual icon or sex symbol; American Masters as do others, suggest that Madonna's continued to be a sexual icon as "she's gotten older". The Oxford Dictionary of English (2010) credited her image as a sex symbol as a source of her international stardom. Overall, it has often been implied that Madonna's status was produced in large part from the way she willfully deployed images of sexuality. 

Educator Ray B. Browne, in Laws of Our Fathers: Popular Culture and the U.S. Constitution (1986), wrote that Madonna is called "that quaintest of things, a sex symbol". A 1989 article from Adweek's Marketing Week explained that "unlike other sex symbols, Madonna is never the victim"; they remembered that other "sex symbols" like Marilyn Monroe were considered as "tragic figures". In The Thirty Years' Wars (1996), Andrew Kopkind regarded Madonna as "the premier sex symbol of the decade" (1990s). Author Stuart Jeffries in Everything, All the Time, Everywhere: How We Became Postmodern (2021), deemed Madonna as the leading sex symbol of the postmodern era, and a different one from Monroe, who he defined as the leading sex symbol of the modern era.

Press and public attention

In Record Collecting for Girls (2011), Courtney Smith documented that most people associate Madonna with sex. By the late 1980s, physicist Stephen Hawking name-checked it joking: "I have sold more books on physics than Madonna has on sex". This Madonna's image perception was stronger in the 1990s. The Hutchinson Softback Encyclopedia of 1996 defines her thus, as a "U.S. pop singer and actress who presents herself on stage and in videos with an exaggerated sexuality". In Profiles of Female Genius (1994), author Gene Landrum describes that Madonna's libidinal energy and sexuality become in her major attraction for the media and "it has become the focal point for her whole career". During this decade, Mark Bego summed up: "Since her arrival on the scene ten years ago, Madonna has become so synonymous with sex (and publicity) that it may be hard to remember that she started as a musical phenomenon."

Historian Andrea Stuart cited a tabloid headline where Madonna was called a "man-eater" and how "she used sex to climb to the top". In this vein, author Adam Sexton called some press pieces as a "creepy moralism" decrying that "reading articles about Madonna, you could get the idea that it was the habit of pop journalists to marry the first person they slept with". In the compendium The Madonna Connection (1993), scholars even wrote that "it is no surprise, then that rumors of Madonna testing HIV-positive have been incredibly persistent". They wrote that certain segments of our culture find comfort in identifying her as a carrier of the AIDS virus—a disease perceived by some as a punishment for immoral behavior— and making Madonna HIV-positive establishes her moral guilt and provides for her ultimate containment by death.

Scholarly attention

The Madonna studies saw a framework of its developments in theories about sexuality. Editors of Encyclopedia of Women in Today's World (2011), explained that critical studies of Madonna, reveal her —as symbol, image, and brand— to be a critical nexus for the exploration of contemporary attitudes, and this includes sexuality. Professor Arthur Asa Berger confirmed both that her notorious usage of sexuality has been imitated by other females, and has raised questions about sexuality (as well of other aspects).

In Sex, Drugs, and Cocoa Puffs (2004), Chuck Klosterman wrote: "Whenever I hear intellectuals talk about sexual icons of the present day, the name mentioned most is Madonna". In Female Celebrity and Ageing (2016), Deborah Jermyn from University of Roehampton cites Steven Anderson's comments on Madonna in 1989 when he classified her as "a repository of all our ideas" such as sex or even death. Jermyn argued that Madonna still functions as a repository of all of these ideas, except now she plays with these in an aging body. By 2015, sexologist Ana Fernández Alonso from Miguel de Cervantes European University, taught in a devoted class of Madonna in University of Oviedo that Madonna is an "important icon" for women and for the way of understanding human sexuality in general, and sexual relations in particular.

Scholars Steven Quartz and Anette Asp recognized that Madonna's cultural relevance is intriguing for her complex influences on areas like sex. In this aspect, Rosemary Pringle from Griffith University wrote in Transitions: New Australian feminisms (2020), that "there has been much controversy in the academy about the cultural and sexual politics of Madonna".

Madonna's sexuality advocacy

Madonna had promoted safe sex awareness in the 1980s and 1990s, and continued to do the same in the next years, as reported Jason Mattera. In Madonna as Postmodern Myth (2002), French scholar Georges-Claude Guilbert concurred saying she often reminds her public during interviews and concerts to use condoms ("Don't be silly... Put a rubber on your willy"). Frances Negrón-Muntaner, commented in Boricua Pop (2004), she used her concerts to promote safe sex as a "remember the dead, and affirm the living". Editors of History+ for Edexcel A Level (2015), summed up that "she talked a great deal about sex, promoted safe sex in her interviews, distributed condoms at her concerts and performer at AIDS benefits".

Madonna donated a percentage of "Papa Don't Preach" (1986) profits to programs advocating sexual responsibility. In a 1988 advertisement for schoolkids, Madonna told "avoid casual sex and you'll avoid AIDS" and "stay away from people who shoot drugs". In the early 1990s, Sire Records had a 900 hotline (900-990-SIRE) that featured a safe-sex message from Madonna. During this decade, she also mentioned about unsafe sex: "I'm not going to sit here and say that from the time I found out about AIDS, I've always had intercourse with a man with a condom on". After the backlash of her first book, Sex, she stated:

American professor and critic, Louis Menand called her "a leading spokesperson for safe sex" in his book American Studies (2003). In 2015, sexologist Ana Fernández Alonso deemed Madonna as a "sexologist" herself due her works or public statements, citing for example: "Poor is the man whose pleasures depend on the permission of another".

Madonna's sexual identity

Scope of audience and literature
Deborah Bell from University of North Carolina, wrote in Masquerade (2015), that "much has been written about Madonna and sexual identity". British sociologist, David Gauntlett asserts Madonna's image as a sexual free spirit has been emphatically defined. 

Aware of other precursors, by 2002, Australian professor Jeff Lewis commented "more than any other single female figure, [she] has self-consciously 'explored' and displayed women's sexuality". The public that witnessed it was extensive, as Canadian professor Karlene Faith wrote in Madonna, Bawdy & Soul (1997), she "has inscribed her sexual identities on the psyches of millions of children, adolescents, and adults in dozens of nations, on half a dozen continents". Professor Santiago Fouz-Hernandez wrote in Madonna's Drowned Worlds (2004) that Madonna symbolized for women in many cultures, sexual liberation.

Madonna's usage of sexuality

Academic Marcel Danesi explained that Madonna has always been in charge of her sexuality, and quoted her as saying: "No man can ever dictate to me what to be. Only I can do so". Gauntlett argues that her sexual assertiveness "has been one of the most distinctive elements of her life and work". Scholar Camille Paglia once defined her sexual persona as "her power".

By many, when Madonna debuted her sexuality offered a "challenge" to dominant definitions of femininity and masculinity. She was a leading figure that represented for many young females across the world, an empowering figure in control of her own body. American philosopher Susan Bordo, explains that Madonna demonstrated her wannabes, the possibility of a female heterosexuality that was independent of patriarchal control; a sexuality that defied rather than rejected the male gaze, teasing it with her own gaze.

In 100 Entertainers Who Changed America (2013), professor Robert Sickels of Whitman College revised some of her 1980s-works, where in her mind, Madonna portrayed the modern woman: comfortable in and gratified by her own sexuality, but still a powerful female. Madonna took the idea further in her next decade, Sickels says. In Contesting Feminist Orthodoxies (1996), it was explained Madonna not only presents herself as a sexual subject/object, but expressly proposes sexuality as a praxis of and towards artistic freedom, women's liberation, and indeed, gay liberation. In this decade, psychiatrist and author Jule Eisenbud concludes that Madonna's refusal to accept that power and femininity "is equivalent to masculinity" and "has allowed her to maintain her status as a sex symbol". Psychologist Jonathan Young, expressed:

Donald C. Miller, in Coming of Age in Popular Culture (2018), acknowledges Madonna by something that set her apart from earlier female performers, as she consistently intertwined sexuality with religion.

Madonna's sexuality has continued to be revisited and commented during the 21st century while aging. In Girl Heroes (2002), Dr. Susan Hopkins commented about a Madonna at age 43, saying that she "is ageing before the world" but she keeps presenting herself as a kind of "sexual revolutionary". In 2008, Edna Gundersen cited Joe Levy editor-in-chief of Blender saying that "she is trying to go somewhere no one has gone before" with the possible exception of Cher. A decade later, in 2018, music scholar Freya Jarman at the University of Liverpool told the press that Madonna "was now demonstrating a new kind of relevance".

Evaluations, and critics

By 1991, New Internationalist regarded Madonna as a "hotly debated sexual icon".

Some sectors criticized her, mainly because her "over sexuality", and it would become a constant through much of her career. Back in the 1990s, Lisa Henderson from Pennsylvania State University, even commented that it was one of the reasons some segments of society "hate Madonna" because she challenges the sexual status quo. Some commentators were very critical towards Madonna's sexual persona. Over the years, opinions include Morrissey who charged her arguing "she is closer to organized prostitution than anything else". Similarly, Steve Allen commented "Madonna's sexuality is, to put the matter quite simply, that of the professional prostitute". Essayist Hal Crowther said: "I think of Madonna as Roboslut, an alien programmed to conquer the earth by attacking our reproductive psychology".

Many feminists were divided by Madonna's sexuality. Some of them viewed her overt sexuality as antifeminist. However, the third-wave feminists who emerged in the 1990s, embraced Madonna as a symbol of female sexuality. In this regard, researcher Brian McNair wrote that "pro and anti-porn feminist made of her a symbol of all that was good or bad (depending on their viewpoint)". Some of her supporters at that time, was Paglia who decried "the simplistic feminism of those 'hangdog dowdies and parochial prudes' that critici[z]e Madonna's brash sexual image is inadequate to explain the impact of this pop icon on million of woman and girls. In Paglia's views, "Madonna has a far profounder vision of sex than do the feminists".

English musicologist Sheila Whiteley, cites teenage fan reactions towards Madonna's sexuality in her early stage as most of them defended Madonna, describing she was "acting responsibly" in bringing sex to the fore, so forcing the media, schools and parents alike to confront the inconsistencies inherent in the public attitude towards female sexuality. By 2017, Daryl Deino of The New York Observer mixed Madonna's fan views with his own to describe:

Following with fan reactions reviews, at the height of these reviews, Roy Shuker from Victoria University of Wellington describes "Madonna's transgressions of sexuality, can be view as a source of much pleasure for a portion of her fandom, but extremely disturbing to her haters". Providing a retrospective, Stephanie Rosenbloom from The New York Times whom described herself as part of her wannabe fandom, explains: "Never had we seen someone so bold, so powerful, so sexually aggressive who was not a man".

By many, her 1990s works "confirmed" and "intensified" her status as a sexually assertive and in-control woman. For others, J. Randy Taraborrelli adds when she tried to explain herself ("I love my pussy, and there's nothing wrong with loving my pussy") she sounded like a lusty porn star no one could take seriously. Australian professor Graeme Turner said that Madonna can be seen as a figure who "exaggerates" (and therefore makes ridiculous) male expectations of female sexuality. Also, Amy Raphael, wrote in Grrrls (1996) that "taking the concept further than any other female artist before her, Madonna sold herself almost exclusively in terms of her sexuality".

Aging Madonna

She further polarized views using an open sexuality while aging. Scholar Deborah Jermyn argues that Madonna for new audiences and her experimentation with sexuality, suggests and has come to mean nothing if the trolling of Madonna's aging body is fundamentally misogynistic and gaining online followers by the thousands. Authors in Ageing Women in Literature and Visual Culture (2017) concludes that Madonna's refusal to retreat into silence in middle age and her repeated assertion of an overt sexuality are demonized, especially in the context of a demonstration for women's equality. Writing for PinkNews in 2023, Marcus Wratten noted commentaries from British tabloid The Daily Mail, saying her "aggressive sexuality" is now "threatening to compromise" her "uncompromisable legacy". They called her for being "desperate".

Censorship and controversies 

In Rethinking the Frankfurt School (2012), Madonna is described as a highly controversial because of her exploitation of sexuality. Madonna has drawn controversies, by her sexuality in her videos, performances and public addresses. In her early analysis on Madonna, Paglia also explored censorship on her figure, saying that she used images of pornography and prostitution to provoke strong reactions, including sectors of political, religious conservatives and feminists. An author suggested that Madonna's display of sexuality "can be understood as politically subversive". A Christian author decries "she has sold literally tens of millions of records on the theme of pornography". 

MTV censured some of her videos because the sexual theme, and this include "Justify My Love". According to an author, Madonna was the "main target" of the concerns about sexuality by the Parents Music Resource Center (PMRC). Susan Baker, a founding member of the PMRC, complained that Madonna was teaching young girls "how to be porn queens in heat". Outside the music industry, sexologist Robert T. Francoeur noted how her first book, Sex faced censorship in various locations.

Scholars Steven Quartz and Anette Asp commented that in popular culture, the contested nature of female sexuality was nowhere more polarizing than in the images created by Madonna. Ian Inglish from University of Northumbria, wrote in Performance and Popular Music (2007) that Madonna served as a "paradigmatic case of the sluttification of women in music video, rock music and popular culture". In Pop Cult: Religion and Popular Music (2010), author Rupert Till wrote:

Counter-criticisms and alternative views

Gauntlett explained that in the past, some artists such as Elvis Presley or Mick Jagger were called "sex gods" due to their sexual display. But, in the context of Madonna and women, the sociologist further adds, this role was unexpected and challenging. For historian Lilly J. Goren, Madonna "correctly argued" that it is a double standard to criticize her for using sexuality to gain power but not to criticize Presley or Jagger for employing the same tactics. Melanie Sjoberg from Australian conservative outlet, Green Left labeled similar responses as "the obvious feminist question".

In Madonnaland, Alina Simone wrote that the sexual double standard becomes clear, when compare Madonna to famously libidinous artists like Jim Morrison or Jagger. In 2016, Emily Ratajkowski uses Madonna and Jagger to compare sexism, because Madonna receives commentaries such as "desperate" or "a hot mess" contrary to him. Since both are performers with similar artistic sexuality brands, she asked: "So why does Madonna get flak for it while Jagger is celebrated?".

By 2015, sexologist Ana Fernández Alonso proposes Madonna knows the difference between fantasies and behavior. She also questioned some attacks on Madonna, saying that those who have the wrong "idea" of what sex is are precisely them. A decade prior, Pete Hamill commented that "she is the triumphant mistress of her medium: the sexual imagination".

In 1990, Caryn James paid tribute to Madonna's "honesty about using sexuality to gain control and power". In 2012, Sara Marcus devoted an article in Salon as "a celebration of the way she changed sexual mores forever". At some point of her career, Paglia praised Madonna saying: "We dissidents now have the momentum in feminism, thanks to Madonna having changed the way millions of young women think about sexuality". On the other hand, American author Sharon Lechter described Madonna as a woman who was able to appreciate, value, and express her sexual energy. For Lechter, sexual energy can create financial fuel for women as well as men.

On ageism, at the 2021 International Conference on Human Aspects of Information, participants found as disgusting the criticism of an aging nature of sexuality. They took the Madonna's case, as the misogynistic rhetoric targeting her highlights it, by ridiculizing her sexual agency and humiliating it by using comparison with younger stars, as a way to shame Madonna.

Some Madonna's responses and reviews on them
Constantine Chatzipapatheodoridis, a Greek adjunct lecturer at University of Patras, wrote that "Madonna responses vary when openly provokes the public with overt sexuality". Madonna addressed criticism of "setting women back 30 years" in a 1984 interview with MTV, saying "I don't think that I'm using sex to sell myself, I think that I'm a very sexual persona and that comes through in my performing, and if that's what gets people to buy my records, then that's fine. But I don't think of it consciously, 'Well, I'm going to be sexy to get people interested in me' It's the way I am, the way I've always been".

Simone, said that in other words, Madonna was being nothing if not authentic when she stripped down or dance lasciviously. Madonna also expressed "her desire to push the boundaries of America's puritanical sexual codes" which are grounded in patriarchy. At some point of her career, Madonna responded, when asked about her sexual energy: "Everyone probably thinks that I'm a raving nymphomaniac, that I have an insatiable sexual appetite, when the truth is I'd rather read a book".

In 2016, after receiving the Billboard Women of the Year, Madonna addressed: "I made my Erotica album and my Sex book was released. I remember being the headline of every newspaper and magazine. Everything I read about myself was damning. I was called a whore and a witch. One headline compared me to Satan. I said, 'Wait a minute, isn't Prince running around with fishnets and high heels and lipstick with his butt hanging out?' Yes, he was. But he was a man".

When Madonna was interviewed on Nightline about her so-called "sexual irresponsibility", she responded: "Why are images of degradation and violence toward women okay, almost mainstream, yet images of two women or two men kissing taboo?" Lynne Layton, a Harvard University lecturer in women's studies, refers to this statement: "Why is it that only Madonna was raising this question, not her critics?"; scholar called that this is "indeed a hypocritical culture". Scholar Lisa Henderson agreed with Layton's views.

Recognition of Madonna's role

In Perversions: Deviant Readings by Mandy Merck (1993) professor Mandy Merck from Royal Holloway reminds that "the story of the sex goddess can never be entirely her own", because despite Madonna may seem to be "the most self-authored sexual artifact of this (or any other) time", her career coincides with long-held positions on pornography, fashion and sexual conduct. 

Some credits relies that she brought to the mainstream awareness some issues, as researcher Brian Longhurst from University of Salford summed up that "it is argued that her videos and books, bring forms of sexual representation, which had been hidden, into the mainstream". To scholar Brian McNair, Madonna's figure announced the arrival of a new phase in western sexual culture. In 2000, British magazine New Statesman said that Madonna "irrevocably changed the media image of female sexuality".

A vast group of observers, actively credited Madonna to open up new forms. As semiotician Marcel Danesi believes that Madonna introduced a new form of feminism, liberating women to express their sexuality on "their own terms". Commenting about this point, associate professors, Richard Santana and Gregory Erickson, also reminded Madonna had been given credit for opening up new ways to experience and express, and this includes sexuality. At some stage of her career, some scholars recognized her ever-involving performance of scenarios that includes sexuality, labeling her as a "trailblazer".

Professor Patrice Oppliger, held "Madonna pioneered a more powerful, if crass, version of women's sexuality". In Queer in the Choir Room (2014), Michelle Parke goes further saying "Madonna single-handedly accelerated the battle between opposing ideas of appropriate expression of female sexuality". British journalist Matt Cain argued Madonna brought female sexuality "front and centre". In Gauntlett's view, Madonna did not invent sexiness in pop, but she could be credited with bringing a female desiring gaze to centre stage. To Simone, "Madonna's sexiness was different, more brutal. And it would only become more so as time went on". The staff of The New Zealand Herald regards Madonna as a "pioneer" of intelligent sex appeal. Editors of Controversial Images (2012), credited that "the unprecedented visibility of sexuality" which Madonna embraced, has also contributed to the creation of the pop music diva—a powerful female music performer who explores sexuality openly and purposefully. E. San Juan Jr. commented "she is credited too with the exercise of 'gender-free sex', blurring the male/female boundaries by flirting with bisexuality, multiple partners and cross-dressing" among other things.

Further discussions

Treva B. Lindsey, a professor of Ohio State University writing for NBC News in 2022, doesn't give "too much" credit to Madonna, but to Blues singers of the mid-20th century, whom she says influenced more in popular culture and on others while mentioning the cases of female rappers such as Lil' Kim, Mary J. Blige or Missy Elliot among many others. Alaina Demopoulos, an editor from The Guardian reminds some criticisms from Black community when the singer gave self-credit, while Demopoulos ironized Madonna "would like to remind us all that she invented sex". Tony Hicks, a music critic from Riff magazine about similar arguments related to the African American culture, said "it's true, to a certain extent", but argues "Madonna's barrier-smashing really was different" and also suggests despite Madonna polarized views, "she was necessary". Back in 2019, Australian magazine The Music commented "Madonna's corporeal feminism impacted on female rappers" such as Cardi B or Lil' Kim among many others female rappers. Some of them, recognized Madonna's influence publicly, like Lil' Kim who held she modeled her own career in that of Madonna, labeling herself as the "Black Madonna". 

Others like the author of Someone like-- Adele (2012) who describes the "trail blazed by Madonna", explained that some artists did not followed it and proposes a "turning point" in consumer music culture contextualizing the case of Adele. By this time, authors of Future Texts (2012), also explained that some millennial pop divas such as Britney Spears or Lady Gaga, used it without "any of the subversive elements that made Madonna's work the subject of feminist inquiry". 

On other views, Kyra Belán, an art historian and professor from Broward College, reinforces in her 2018 book The Virgin in Art that Madonna has opened the doors for other women artists as she established a "new frontier" for female sexuality through a variety of popular vehicles and technologies. Another supporter is professor Robert Sickels, who describes her sexuality have been "vastly influential in paving the way" for not only the sexual expression of future female musicians, but also the acceptance of different forms of sexuality of countless of artists. Sociologist David Gauntlett is also of the idea that future female artists from post Madonna-era, have accessibility to express their own sexuality largely thanks "after her". In 2012, The Advocate said that her career was based in pushing sexual boundaries, paving the way, and "everyone since [...] has walked that path". By 2017, Sergio del Amo, editor of Spanish newspaper El País commented that Madonna paved the way for several artists to express themselves in terms of sexuality and without receiving a piece of the criticism that Madonna faced in the past. Madonna herself, supported Miley Cyrus against criticism for her highly sexualised image in the mid 2010s.

Attributed effects on culture 

The advent of Madonna, contributions and effects were understood variously as well. In Sex Symbols (1999), editor explained that Madonna "has pushed the boundaries that most women do not wish to broach". Within a similar perception, editors of The Twentieth Century in 100 Moments (2016), considering many examples and how today celebrities are open in ways "unimaginable a hundred years ago" attribute her a notable role, saying "perhaps more than anyone else, Madonna swayed American culture in that direction at the tail end of the twentieth century". By 2012, Sara Marcus said that "her revelatory spreading of sexual liberation to Middle America, changed the country for the better. And that's not old news, we're still living it". Years prior, media scholars Charlotte Brunsdon and Lynn Spigel, explained that she "inverted" or at least "challenged", America's notions of sex, gender and power exploring taboos. 

Her influence was also noted in the pornographic imagery during her first decades. Professor McNair, analyzed it saying as she was "already established as the world's foremost female pop star, it meant that her use of explicit imagery threw established paradigms for making sense of the pornographic into disarray". McNair, continued explaining its effects saying that with her Sex book alone, she strongly influenced the sexual culture and politics in its decade debut, because it broke a number of taboos. In another conclusion, he said that both the book and her album Erotica, contributed substantially to the creation of a cultural climate within which it became possible to treat porn as just another subject. By the early 1990s, Cheryl Overs, a spokesperson of the pro-prostitution organization Network of Sex Work Projects, understands Madonna to have aided in the normalization of prostitution in malestream culture. She then credits Madonna with making their work very much easier in the 1980s.

In Cultural Studies: Theory and Practice (2011), Chris Barker said that Madonna is a significant point of reference in the raunch culture. In another target, James Naremore reported in the 1990s, that adolescent girls construct relevance between Madonna's sexuality and their own conditions of existence. Conversely, Madonna's critic bell hooks charged her in the 1990s, as in part, many black women who are disgusted by Madonna's flaunting of sexual experience are enraged because the very image of sexual agency that she is able to project and affirm with material gain has been the stick the society has used to justify its continued beating and assault on the black female body.

In music industry 

In 2009, historian Lilly J. Goren commented that Madonna perpetuated the public perception of women performers as feminine and sexual objects. And this have an effect for women musicians who wanted to be taken seriously by the public, due to the "damaging" Madonna's use of sexuality. In 2004, Shmuley Boteach attacked Madonna, saying that for more than two decades, she has been allowed to destroy the female recording industry by erasing the line that separates music from pornography. As before Madonna, it was possible for women more famous for their voices than their cleavage. Boteach further added, that in the post-Madonna universe, artists feel the pressure to expose their bodies in order to sell albums. Feminist scholars Cheris Kramarae and Dale Spender explained "Madonna may have preached control, but she created an illusion of sexual availability that many female pop artists felt compelled to emulate".

Conversely Goren, also explored how others taken benefit of Madonna's sexuality. She found that the music industry exploited Madonna's tactics in order to increase sales. Scholar at first instance commented that Madonna challenged how sexuality and sex should be portrayed on MTV, later arguing: "With the popularity of Madonna and through the medium of MTV, the music industry worked to produce solo acts such as Debbie Gibson, Pebbles, and Tiffany. The use of the media to market sexuality and thereby sell records has only increased in recent decades".

Some industry fellows like Joni Mitchell blasted Madonna, as Joe Taysom from Far Out says, before Madonna, "it wasn't a particularly popular route of expressions for female musicians at the time". Although, she wouldn't out it "all on Madonna", American singer Sheryl Crow granted her a more serious role than others for damage the image of women using sex as a "form of power" in their "business form". On the contrary, some praised Madonna's influential and different path, such as Tove Lo, or Christina Aguilera. Lo said: "Madonna broke down barriers to allow female artists to express their sexuality. Madonna paved the way— she did all this hard work for us". In similar remarks, Louise Redknapp praised Madonna, saying "without Madonna so many of us wouldn't have been doing what we were doing". Madonna herself, responded to Mitchell's commentaries that "women in pop are sexually exploited", saying "We are exploring our sexuality".

Depictions of her sexual-brand

In Madonna as Postmodern Myth (2002), French scholar Georges-Claude Guilbert explains producers and distributors have used Madonna's image to serve their interests. He mentioned the case of Columbia Pictures when they gave away with magazine Hollywood Avenue an audio cassette that helped to promote A League of Their Own explaining that the tape sold sex and exploited Madonna's sexual image as well.

Inspired in Madonna, Netherlands-based company VDM International started to sell condoms in the late 1990s, throughout Europe and Japan, receiving a "high demand". Named the "Madonna Condoms", it featured the singer's face on the boxes and internal package, taken from her nude photos shoot by Martin Schreiber in 1979 which sold them the license. The US rights was bought by CondoMania, a Hollywood-based company. Its president and founder Adam Glickman, stated that "he's using the 'Madonna Condom' to help educate people about safe sex". According to an online product description: "'Madonna Condoms', like the singer, are strong, silky and sensuous, and sure to make you feel like it's the very first time". According to Los Angeles Times, CondoMania began selling the condoms on August 25 in 2001, and sold more than 1,000 boxes in its first three days.

In 2004, The Douglas County AIDS Project, was the winner of a nationwide contest of 21,000 "Madonna Condoms" handed out by Madonna look-alike drag queens during the Gay Pride Week on the Kansas University campus. The next year, 2005, CondoMania donated 30,000 "Madonna Condoms" to the Los Angeles Gay and Lesbian Center and New York's Gay Men's Health Crisis.

Listicles and superlatives 
In her first decades, aside to being named a sexual icon or sex symbol, either press or academic publications called her variously. She received nicknames associated to her sexuality. In a 1994 article of Esquire, Madonna was named the "Sex Queen of America". Others called her a "Sex Queen" and a "Porn Queen". Boze Hadleigh wrote that she "become a sex goddess for all generations and genders". Madonna was suggested as an "icon of sex appeal" by art historian David Morgan. Author Brian D'Amato, called Madonna, Marilyn Monroe and the Mona Lisa, as the three sexiest women ever being with the letter "M". At the height of her sexual brand image, agents like psychologist Joyce Brothers echoed: "Madonna is a sexy person for our time". In Chris Moyles's book The Gospel According to Chris Moyles, a young Madonna is cited as "one of the sexiest women on the planet", as generally the consensus is: "Madonna is one sexy fucking woman!". 

Madonna was voted as the world's Hottest Woman by readers of woman's magazine Cosmopolitan in 2000. Similarly, in 2002 VH1 ranked her as the Greatest Sexiest Artist. She was included once again, in their 2013 updated list, with the staff saying: "You can say many things about Madonna, but you can't ever say she's not sexy". In 2006, Madonna topped the rank of Toronto Suns 50 Greatest Sex Symbols in history, as "acknowledgment of her extraordinary aptitude for using sex to provoke and promote". They also reported: "While others have been sexier, none has been more cunning in needling and nudging popular tastes to their own commercial again". In 2012, Madonna was placed at number 9 in Complex list of the "100 Hottest Female Singers of All Time". In 2020, Men's Health included Madonna in their "100 Hottest Sex Symbols of All Time", with staff declaring: She "has captured the world's heads, hearts, and hormones with startling consistency".

Back in the 1990s, an author described Madonna as "the most arcane and sexually perverse female of the twentieth century". Critics like Achille Bonito Oliva have cited that for some "Madonna restored the [image of] Whore of Babylon, the pagan goddess banned by the last book of the Bible". Others similarly argued that she became synonymous with the "Bimbo of Babylon". In the compendium The Madonna Connection (1993), scholars considering criticisms she has faced, it was concluded that "another mythical feminine monster summoned up to make sense of Madonna is the succubus".

References

Book sources

Further reading
 Sex Symbols Should Teach Classes — Grand Valley State University
 Madonna's 'sexuality' should be more advanced than a 20-year-old's — By Meghan Murphy
 “Madonna Was My Sex-Ed Teacher”: A Conversation with R/B Mertz — Los Angeles Review of Books

Sexuality
Sexuality of individuals
Women and sexuality